This is a list of members of the Victorian Legislative Assembly, from the elections of 5 March 1886 to the elections of 28 March 1889. Victoria was a British self-governing colony in Australia at the time.

Note the "Term in Office" refers to that members term(s) in the Assembly, not necessarily for that electorate.

Peter Lalor was Speaker, Thomas Cooper was Chairman of Committees.

 Clark resigned October 1887; replaced by James Mirams, sworn-in November 1887.
 Madden died 12 January 1888; replaced by Bryan O'Loghlen, sworn-in June 1888.
 Sands resigned July 1867; replaced by John Gavan Duffy, sworn-in August 1867.
 Wallace died 23 May 1886, replaced by Peter Wright.

References

Members of the Parliament of Victoria by term
19th-century Australian politicians